Zumbo District is a district of Tete Province in westernmost Mozambique. The principal town is Zumbo.

Further reading
District profile (PDF)

Districts in Tete Province